1968 was declared the International Year of Human Rights by UNESCO, with the principal goal of bringing attention to the state of human rights throughout the world. On its XX session on March 17–18, 1964, the United Nations Commission on Human Rights considered the decision of the United Nations General Assembly's Eighteenth session to proclaim an International Year of Human Rights, recommending the establishment of a committee in preparation of the celebration of the 20th anniversary of the Universal Declaration of Human Rights and the organisation of an international conference on human rights.

See also 
 Human rights
 Human Rights Day
 History of human rights
 Timeline of young people's rights in the United Kingdom
 Timeline of young people's rights in the United States
 Slavery in international law
 Slavery in Russia
 Slavery in the United States
 Slave Trade Acts
 Human rights in China (PRC)
 Command responsibility
 "Consent of the governed"
 Moral universalism
 Declaration on Great Apes, an effort to extend some human rights to other great apes

 Racial equality proposal (1919)
 The Farewell Sermon (632 CE)
 Youth for Human Rights International

References

Human Rights
International observances
1968 in the United Nations